Krasiński Square is a square in the central district of Warsaw, Poland. The square itself is adjacent to Warsaw Old Town and features buildings of great historical and national significance.

History
It was formed at the end of the 18th century from the former courtyard of the Krasiński Palace. During the Congress Poland era, it served as a market place for wool. As a result, two iron wells were built in 1823. In 1838 the Badeni Palace was constructed on the square. From the end of the 19th century until 1939, the square, together with the Miodowa Street, served as the judicial district. In the interwar period the Badeni Palace housed the Court of Appeals, while the Krasiński Palace housed the Supreme Court. During World War II the square served as a buffer zone between the Warsaw Ghetto and the other part of the city. Due to this most of the buildings in the area of the square were destroyed.

Landmarks on the square include the Krasiński Palace, the Warsaw Uprising Monument, the modern Supreme Court building, and the Field Cathedral of the Polish Army. The Krasiński Garden is located nearby. The Badeni Palace that was once located on the square before World War II was completely demolished by Germans in 1944.

References 

Squares in Warsaw
Warsaw, Krasiński Square